Martin Ramsland (born 2 April 1993) is a Norwegian football striker who currently plays for Norwegian First Division side Sandnes Ulf.

He hails from Øyslebø, and started his career in local club Marnardal IL. After playing in the Sixth Division he jumped four tiers to play for Mandalskameratene in the Second Division. Discovered by larger clubs, notably Viking and Start, he was signed on loan by Strømmen in 2013, a move that was made permanent. In 2016, he joined Sogndal, who were particularly impressed by Ramsland's stats collected by an analytic tool named ZXY. He made his Norwegian Premier League debut in March 2016 against Bodø/Glimt.

On 12th of December 2019, Ramsland got a 5 and a half minute hattrick to turn the score against Lillestrøm from 4-0 to 4-3 to make IK Start promote on away goals to the Eliteserien.

Career statistics

Club

References

1993 births
Living people
People from Vest-Agder
Norwegian footballers
Mandalskameratene players
Strømmen IF players
Sogndal Fotball players
IK Start players
Norwegian First Division players
Eliteserien players
Association football forwards
Sportspeople from Agder